Ada Ferrer-i-Carbonell (born 17 November 1971 in Sabadell, Spain) is an economist and professor at the Barcelona Graduate School of Economics, tenured scientist at CSIC-IAE, MOVE research fellow, and a research fellow at the IZA Institute of Labor Economics. She was an associate editor of the Journal of Economic Behavior and Organization and currently is a member of the London School of Economics-based World Well-Being Panel. She holds two PhDs in economics, one from Rensselaer Polytechnic Institute and the other from the Tinbergen Institute and the University of Amsterdam.

Research and publications 
Her research focuses on econometrics, measures of welfare and happiness, environmental economics and behavioral economics. She has published two books about happiness measurement. Her first book named Happiness Quantified is written jointly with Bernard M.S. Praag and was published in 2004 by Oxford University Press. Her second book Happiness Economics: A New Road to Measuring and Comparing Happiness (Foundations and Trends(r) in Microeconomics)was published in 2011 jointly with Bernard M.S. Praag. Her work has been widely cited and she counts over 11000 citations in economics and scientific publications such as Nature. Her research has been featured in media outlets such as The Economist, has been interviewed on Catalan national radio, and written for the newspaper La Vanguardia.

References

Living people
Spanish women economists
Academic staff of the Barcelona Graduate School of Economics
Spanish economists
Rensselaer Polytechnic Institute alumni
University of Amsterdam alumni
1971 births
Economists from Catalonia
People from Sabadell